John Clayton Smith (15 September 1910 – 1986) was a footballer who played 347 league matches for Sheffield United between 1931 and 1949 as a goalkeeper.

He began by playing outfield for Bolsterstone FC, and first played in goal when replacing an injured team-mate. After an excellent performance, he remained as goalkeeper for the rest of the season, attracting the interest of both Sheffield clubs. He signed amateur forms with Sheffield Wednesday who loaned him to Worksop Town, but it was United who signed him as a professional after a couple of trial games in the Central League. Jack became one of the Blades most popular players, always remembered for his cheerful grin. Not for nothing he was nicknamed Smiler.

Between December 1935 and October 1947, he made 203 consecutive league appearances for United. Smith played for Sheffield United for 19 years, and in the final match of the 1948–49 season – a County Cup match against Barnsley – he was chaired from the field.

This was to have been his last appearance for the Blades, but he was forced out of retirement the following season for two matches due to an injury crisis. His final game was away at Grimsby Town in the Second Division on 24 September 1949, aged 39.

Career statistics

Baseball
Smith also played baseball for Sheffield Dons during their two seasons, 1936 and 1937, in the semi-proffesional Yorkshire Baseball League. He was an accomplished keeper of 1st base. Notably in 1937, he played alongside Canadians Happy Kasnoff and Eddie Gladu and American Joe 'Snowball' Washington. Smith also represented Yorkshire at baseball

References

External links

1910 births
1986 deaths
English footballers
Sheffield United F.C. players
English Football League players
Association football goalkeepers
Footballers from Sheffield
Worksop Town F.C. players
Date of death missing
FA Cup Final players